The Scottish Rite Cathedral, at 3633 Lindell Boulevard in St. Louis, Missouri, is a historic, significant building that was designed by architect William B. Ittner.  It was completed in 1924. "A fine example of neo Classic style, the building has a frontage of 235 feet and is approached by a broad flight of steps. Its auditorium, which seats 3000 persons, is notable because no posts obstruct the view. Features are an extremely wide proscenium and a fine organ. The granite and limestone structure was erected at a cost of $2,000,000."

See also
Moolah Temple, at 3821 Lindell, completed in 1912
New Masonic Temple, at 3681 Lindell, completed in 1926

References

Buildings and structures in St. Louis
Masonic buildings in Missouri
Masonic buildings completed in 1924
Neoclassical architecture in Missouri
Midtown St. Louis